The Alzheimer's Association was founded by Jerome H. Stone with the help of several family members in Chicago, Illinois, and incorporated on April 10, 1980, as the Alzheimer's Disease and Related Disorders Association, Inc. It is a non-profit American volunteer health organization which focuses on care, support and research for Alzheimer's disease. The Alzheimer's Association is the largest non-profit funder of Alzheimer's disease research. The organization has chapters and communities across the nation, with its national office located in Chicago and the public policy office in Washington, D.C. Its mission is "to eliminate Alzheimer's disease through the advancement of research; to provide and enhance care and support for all affected; and to reduce the risk of dementia through the promotion of brain health."

History
Jerome H. Stone founded the Alzheimer's Association with the help of several family support groups after meeting with the National Institute on Aging in 1979. Stone's Alzheimer's research efforts began in 1970 when his wife was first diagnosed with the disease. During the 1970s there was very little information available about Alzheimer's disease. Only a few support groups existed at the time.  Through his research efforts, he joined with seven independent groups who wanted to form a national organization. The groups consisted of researchers, physicians, caregivers, and other humanitarians. Together they held their first official meeting on December 4, 1979, to discuss solutions for the need for Alzheimer's information, care, and cure for the disease.

The Alzheimer's Disease and Related Disorders Association was incorporated on April 10, 1980.  In that year, the National Institutes of Health (NIH) invested $13 million in Alzheimer's disease research. In 1982, President Ronald Reagan designated the first National Alzheimer's Disease Awareness Week. With sub-chapters being founded nationwide, the organization launched its own research programs.

Events

Rita Hayworth Galas 
In 1980 actress and dancer Rita Hayworth was diagnosed with Alzheimer's disease, which contributed to her death in 1987 at the age of 68. The public disclosure and discussion of her illness drew international attention to Alzheimer's disease, a disease that had been virtually forgotten by the medical community since its discovery in 1906, and helped to greatly increase public and private funding for Alzheimer's disease research. The Rita Hayworth Gala, a benefit for the Alzheimer's Association, is held annually in Chicago and New York City. The program was founded in May 1985 by Princess Yasmin Aga Khan, in honor of her mother.

A Night at Sardi's
Started in 1992 by Laurie Burrows Grad in memory of her father writer/director and Pulitzer Prize winner Abe Burrows who died from Alzheimer's disease, A Night at Sardi's was an evening of entertainment that has raised over $28 million for the Alzheimer's Association. The benefit, originally chaired by Burrows Grad and her husband, Peter Grad, was held for the last time on March 9, 2016, and raised over $1.5 million. This 24th and final "A Night at Sardi's" was chaired by Burrows Grad, James Burrows and Nicholas Grad, honoring and paying tribute to Laurie's late husband with the Philanthropy Award.

Blondes vs. Brunettes/RivALZ

Blondes vs. Brunettes Powderpuff football games were started by Sara Allen Abbott, whose father, Texas State Representative Joseph Hugh Allen, died of Alzheimer's disease in 2008. Looking for a way to raise funds for the Alzheimer's Association, Abbott organized a powder puff football game in tribute to her father, a lifelong football fan. The game is now played in 16 cities and Abbott has received national recognition for her efforts in raising over $2 million for the Alzheimer's Association.

In 2014, "Blondes vs. Brunettes" rebranded as "RivALZ".

Advocacy Forum
The Alzheimer's Association Advocacy Forum is an annual gathering that takes place in the spring in Washington, D.C. The multi-day event includes training sessions, celebrity guests, banquets, multimedia experiences and topical presentations focusing on Alzheimer's disease policy-making and legislation. The feature of the event is a lobby day during which time volunteer attendees conduct meetings with members of Congress on Capitol Hill. Past guest speakers and attendees include Soleil Moon-Frye, David Hyde Pierce, Lisa Genova, political commentators Frank Luntz and Charlie Cook, and members of Congress.

Walk to End Alzheimer's 
The Walk to End Alzheimer's is the world's largest event, hosted by The Alzheimer's Association, to bring awareness to Alzheimer's care. This event is held once a year in over 600 communities nationwide, brings together people of different ages, backgrounds and relationships to the disease to join the battle to fight against the disease.

Alzheimer's Association International Conference
In 2000, the Alzheimer's Association anticipated establishing and running the Alzheimer's Association International Conference (AAIC) and has made improvements in attendance, conceptual submissions and research-based presentations, and media relationships. The purpose of the AAIC is to join researchers together from all around the globe to report and converse about innovative research and data on the source, findings, cure, and prevention of Alzheimer's disease and associated illnesses. The AAIC is held annually and is the world's only largest forum for sharing research regarding the dementia research community.

They accept thousands of abstract submissions and hold more than 2,000 scientific meetings to touch the millions of people affected by Alzheimer's with the use of print newspapers, radio broadcasting, and television newscast exposure. The AAIC has gained news coverage from ABC, the BBC, CBS, CNN, NBC, the Associated Press, Reuters, Good Morning America, The Wall Street Journal, The Washington Post, USA Today, WebMD.com and Forbes.com. Through the customs of the Alzheimer's Association International Conference on Alzheimer's Disease (ICAD), the AAIC attempts to gather authority figures from more than 70 different countries to network and converse the most current dementia research outcomes and ideas in 2018.

Alzheimer's Impact Movement
Established in 2010, the Alzheimer's Impact Movement (AIM) is a registered 501(c)(4) advocacy organization that works in partnership with the Alzheimer's Association. AIM is a membership organization that is non-partisan and non-profit, with the objective to make Alzheimer's disease a national importance. AIM supports policies designed to find an end to Alzheimer's disease through improved investments in research, enhanced care and support, and the advancement of methods designed to decrease the chance of developing dementia.  AIM and the Alzheimer's Association offers a 24/7 helpline to provide advice, information, and support for those living with Alzheimer's disease, their caretakers, medical experts, and the community. AIM is a sister organization of the Alzheimer's Association, which has a voluntary and non-partisan political action committee, AIMPAC. AIMPAC is the political side of AIM, their goal is to inform members of Congress about the serious problems of Alzheimer's disease with the help of the main concerns of the Alzheimer's Association.

During the 2015 and 2016 United States Presidential primary season, AIM supporters pressured each of the candidates for their individual ideas to end Alzheimer's. In the 2016 Presidential Election, AIM and the Alzheimer's Association distributed a national voter survey and results showed that 73 million voters in America knew someone close to them with Alzheimer's disease.

Achievements

The Alzheimer's Association has partaken in many opportunities to assist in diagnosing and treating Alzheimer's disease.  In 1987 the Alzheimer's Association teamed up with the NIA and Warner-Lambert Pharmaceutical Company (now known as Pfizer) and helped launch and recruit participants for clinical trials of the first drug to specifically target symptoms of Alzheimer's disease. In 1995, the Alzheimer's Association funded the development of a mouse model of a rare neurodegenerative disorder, thus laying down the technical foundation for Alzheimer's mouse models. In 2003, the Alzheimer's Association partnered with the NIA in finding participants for the National Alzheimer's Disease Genetics Study in order to identify Alzheimer's risk in genes.

In 2004, researchers shared their first findings on an imaging agent called Pittsburg compound B (PiB), a major potential breakthrough in disease monitoring and early detection that the Alzheimer's Association provided significant support to. In that same year, the Alzheimer's Association joined in sponsoring the Alzheimer's Disease Neuroimaging Initiative, a nationwide study that aims to create a standardized method for obtaining and interpreting brain images. In 2005, the Alzheimer's Association launched Alzheimer's & Dementia: The Journal of the Alzheimer's Association in hopes of furthering a worldwide, interdisciplinary exchange within the Alzheimer's research community. In 2008, with the goal of maintaining or improving the cognitive performance of adults, the Alzheimer's Association and the U.S. Centers for Disease Control and Prevention launched the Healthy Brain Initiative.  In that same year, the Alzheimer's Association created the International Society to Advance Alzheimer's Research and Treatment (ISTAART).  In 2011, three workgroups brought together by the Alzheimer's Association and the NIA updated the information and guidelines for diagnosing Alzheimer's disease and came up with research criteria to define a new preclinical stage. In 2015, two new journals Alzheimer’s & Dementia: Diagnosis, Assessment & Disease Monitoring and Alzheimer's & Dementia: Translational Research & Clinical Interventions were launched alongside the existing Alzheimer's & Dementia: The Journal of the Alzheimer's Association.

See also
 Ronald and Nancy Reagan Research Institute
 Alzheimer's Disease International
 Alzheimer's Society

References

External links
 
 Alzheimer's Impact Movement

Alzheimer's and dementia organizations
Organizations established in 1980
Non-profit organizations based in Chicago
Mental health organizations in Illinois